The 2009 K3 League, also known as Daum K3 League 2009, was the third season of the amateur K3 League. All clubs played home and away season, and the playoffs were not held in this year. Before the start of the season, Changwon United and Seoul Pabal withdrew from the league, but Cheongju Jikji, Icheon Citizen and Seoul FC Martyrs joined the league.

League table

See also
2009 in South Korean football
2009 Korean FA Cup

References

External links

K3 League (2007–2019) seasons
2009 in South Korean football